Steven Lutvak (born 1959) is an American musician based in New York City. He is a composer for theatre and film, as well as a singer-songwriter.

Career 
Lutvak is most known for his work on A Gentleman's Guide to Love and Murder with Robert L. Freedman, which ran for over two years on Broadway and won the Tony Award for Best Musical. For his work on the show, Lutvak was also nominated for the Tony Award for Best Original Score. He has also composed the title track to documentary film Mad Hot Ballroom, and has written music for The Wayside Inn, Esmeralda, Almost September, and Campaign of the Century. Lutvak has also released his own album entitled The Time it Takes.

Awards and recognition 
In 2014 Lutvak's A Gentleman's Guide to Love and Murder won the Drama Desk Award for Outstanding Lyrics, and was also nominated for Outstanding Music. The show was also nominated for an Outer Critics Circle Award for Outstanding New Score, and received a Tony Award nomination for Original Score. In 2006, Lutvak received the Kleban Award for Lyric Writing for the Theater, as well as the Fred Ebb Award for Songwriting for the Theater alongside Robert L. Freedman. Lutvak was a 2005 recipient of the American Theatre Wing's Jonathan Larson Grant. Lutvak is associated with the Sundance Theatre Institute, has won a Johnny Mercer Foundation Emerging American Songwriter Award, two Bistro Awards, three MAC Awards, and is a multi-time recipient of an ASCAP Award.

References

Further reading 
Playbill: A Chat With Steven Lutvak and Robert L. Freedman, the Gentlemen Behind the Murder

1959 births
Living people
21st-century American composers
American film score composers
American musical theatre composers
American male singer-songwriters
Broadway composers and lyricists
Drama Desk Award winners
Musicians from New York City
21st-century American male singers
21st-century American singers
Singer-songwriters from New York (state)